is a railway station on the Aizu Railway Aizu Line in the city of Aizuwakamatsu, Fukushima Prefecture, Japan, operated by the Aizu Railway..

Lines
Minami-Wakamatsu Station is served by the Aizu Line, and is located 3.0 rail kilometers from the official starting point of the line at Nishi-Wakamatsu Station.

Station layout
Minami-Wakamatsu Station has one single side platform serving a single bi-directional track. The station is unattended.

Adjacent stations

History
Minami-Wakamatsu Station opened on August 10, 1995.

Surrounding area
 Monden Post Office

External links
  Aizu Railway Station information 

Railway stations in Fukushima Prefecture
Aizu Line
Railway stations in Japan opened in 1995
Aizuwakamatsu